Comiskey may refer to:

Comiskey Park, a ballpark in which the Chicago White Sox played from 1910 to 1990
New Comiskey Park, the White Sox playing venue since 1991
Comiskey, Kansas, a ghost town

People with the surname
Comiskey (surname)
Andrew Comiskey, American Christian theologian
Barrett Comiskey (born 1975), American inventor, founder and CEO of Migo
Brendan Comiskey (born 1935), former Roman Catholic bishop of the Diocese of Ferns
Dan Comiskey (born 1972), offensive lineman for the Edmonton Eskimos of the Canadian Football League
Patrick Comiskey, American journalist and wine writer
An American family in the history of the Baseball team Chicago White Sox:
John Comiskey (politician) (1826–1900), father of Charles Comiskey
Charles Comiskey (1859–1931), player, manager, team owner
J. Louis Comiskey (1885–1939), son of Charles, inherited the White Sox
Grace Comiskey (1894–1956), widow of J. Louis, inherited the White Sox
Dorothy Comiskey Rigney (1917–1971), daughter of J. Louis and Grace, inherited a majority interest in the White Sox
Chuck Comiskey (1925–2007), son of J. Louis and Grace, inherited a minority interest in the White Sox

See also
 Commiskey, Indiana